Quiet Is the New Loud is the debut album by Norwegian indie pop duo Kings of Convenience, released on 29 January 2001 by Astralwerks.

Critical reception

Quiet Is the New Loud received mostly positive reviews from contemporary music critics. At Metacritic, which assigns a normalized rating out of 100 to reviews from mainstream critics, the album received an average score of 71, based on 11 reviews, which indicates "generally favorable reviews". Caroline Hennessy of RTÉ was quoted saying that "If quiet is indeed the new loud then Eirik and Erlend are on to a sure winner. A bittersweet pop album to wrap yourself up in when the world feels like a scary place."

Track listing

Personnel
Kings of Convenience
Erlend Øye – steel string acoustic and electric guitars, harmony (all but 5) and lead (5) vocals, piano, drums, percussion, string arrangements
Eirik Glambek Bøe – nylon string acoustic and electric guitars, lead (all but 5) and harmony (5) vocals, piano, drums, string arrangements

Additional personnel
Ian Bracken – cello (4, 5, 8, 10)
Matt McGeever – cello (1)
Ben Dumville – trumpet (3)
Tarjei Strøm – drum fills (5)

Certifications

References

Kings of Convenience albums
2001 debut albums
Albums produced by Ken Nelson (British record producer)
Astralwerks albums